Jonathan Carr may refer to:

Jonathan Carr (writer) (1942–2008), British writer and journalist
Jonathan Carr (property developer) (1845–1915), London cloth merchant and property developer
Jonathan Dodgson Carr, industrial baker, founder of Carr's
Jonathan Carr (born 1979/1980), American murderer in the Wichita Massacre

See also
John Carr (disambiguation)